Wings Neck is a peninsula that juts out into Buzzards Bay on the south side of the Cape Cod Canal, in Bourne, Massachusetts, USA.

The southwestern tip of the neck is the site of the Wing's Neck Lighthouse, which operated from 1889 to 1945, and is now a private residence.

References

External links
Map: 

Bourne, Massachusetts
Peninsulas of Massachusetts
Landforms of Barnstable County, Massachusetts